Lucbel Carolina Indriago Pinto (born August 22, 1980, in Valencia) is a Venezuelan American show hostess and a pageant titleholder. She was born in Valencia, Venezuela on August 22, 1980. She is the first woman of noticeably African heritage to win the Miss Venezuela title. Indriago was the Miss Venezuela titleholder for 1998, and was the official representative of Venezuela to the Miss Universe 1999 pageant held in Chaguaramas, Trinidad and Tobago on May 26, 1999, when she ended up with a Top 5 finish in the competition.

Carolina was also a TV host in Venezuela, where she hosted the show Portada's on Venevision.

References

External links
Miss Venezuela Official Website
Miss Universe Official Website

1980 births
Living people
Miss Universe 1999 contestants
Miss Venezuela winners
People from Valencia, Venezuela